Competitions in Ballroom dancing in the former Soviet Union were held in three dance categories:

Standard dances, Latin dances, and Soviet dances ("Советская программа").

Soviet category 

The Soviet category comprised
- Polka - Rylio - Varu-Varu - Sudarushka - Russian Lyrical

With the exception of Polka, these dances were choreographed basing on some folk dances of Soviet republics.
 - Rylio is of Lithuanian origin, created by Skaistė Idzelevičienė, the leader of the Lithuanian ballroom formation team Žuvėdra.
 - Varu-Varu (translated as "I can, I can") is of Latvian origin.
 - Sudarushka (loosely translated as "sweetheart") and Russian Lyrical are Russian.

The former three are "fast" or "rhythmic" dances, the latter two are "slow" or "lyrical" ones.

All of them had distinctive basic techniques. The hold was either open or loose, without body contact. Polka had the tightest hold. Polka, Sudarushka and Russian Lyrical were progressive dances, i.e., moving along the line of dance. Rylio and Varu-Varu were of "stationary" type.

Soviet ballroom dances were a relatively new creation. This dance category was introduced with the stated agenda to counterbalance the influence of Western culture (i.e., Ballroom dancing, rock music, the Beatles, etc.). During the relatively short existence of Soviet Ballroom, only the first three had a chance of becoming true Ballroom/Social dances, judging by the flexibility and spontaneity of choreography, willingness of dancers to dance them during practice hours, etc. Rylio had all chances to repeat the evolution of Swing dances: it was danced quite differently in Baltic republics (smoothly), in Belarus (jumpy), and in Moscow. On the contrary, a heat of Sudarushka during a ballroom competition often looked like a performance of a formation team, all competitors dancing almost the same routine. 

At the peak of popularity some huge ball rooms of Moscow Palaces of Culture crowded parties of several hundred of ballroom couples in 4-5 concentric circles of Sudarushka.

Today the category is obsolete, but the dances themselves survived, moved back to the category of folk dances. At some dance events, such as "Neva Cup" (Невский кубок) in St. Petersburg, balls of Esta-Mephi club, Moscow, or "Russian Formation Cup-2007" held in Tyumen these dances comprise the competition category of "Homeland Dances" (Отечественные танцы).

Some basic step-rhythm patterns

The count cues could be any of 12345678, 12341234, 1&2&3&4& or 1&2&1&2&.

Rylio
In-place basic:
Double hand hold in various positions, e.g., sidewise-forward on the shoulder level, elbows bent down. 
Steps of partners are mirrored.
1-2, 3-4, 5-6-7-8: tap-step, tap-step, step-step-step-step.
All steps/taps are in place, with slight one-foot skipping action. Author - choreographer - Adomas Gineitis

Varu-Varu

The dance is based on simple steps and jumpy movements created in 1950s in Latvia. It may be danced with any in 4/4 time disco music.
In-place basic:
Double hand hold, waist level.
Partners start with the same foot and go in a small circle, first in one direction, then in the opposite one.
1-2-3-4, 5-6-7-8: side-together-side-heel, side-together-side-heel
Skips: (12),(34),5,6,(78) (or slow-slow-quick-quick-slow): skip...skip...skip-skip-skip. A skip is from one foot to another, the freed foot pointing forward, toe on the floor.

Sudarushka
The dance is based on Russian khorovod dances. the dance is of vivid and light character, of medium to faster tempo in 2/4 time.
Triple-Step Basic Walks:
 Right-to-left handhold, Free hands are on the waist. 
 Steps are mirrored, along the line of dance.
 1-2-3-4, 5-6-7-8: step-step-step-tap, step-step-step-tap. 
Tap is toe beside the support foot.
Initially the partners face each other. During the first triple step they "fan out" away from each other, free arms fanning sidewise. During the second triple partners "fan in", back to facing each other, free hands back on the waist.

Russian Lyrical
The dance is based on Russian folk tunes. It has a soft and smooth character, danced at medium tempo in 2/4 or 4/4 time.
Starts in shadow position, man's right hand on lady's waist, left arms linked pointing left diagonal.
Most walks are based on "Russian triple step": step-step-step-hold. It can be performed forward, backward, with turn on any step.

The recommended tunes are "Русский лирический" (Russian Lyrical) or "Подмосковные вечера" (Moscow Nights)

Other Soviet ballroom
Ballroom dance manuals of Soviet times list quite a few other Soviet dances promoted to counter the influence of the "Western way of life", created basing on folk dances of the peoples of the Soviet Union and Soviet Bloc:
Tuyana / Туяна (Buryat origin)
Yatranochka / Ятраночка (Ukrainian, "A Girl from the Yatran River")
Slavutyanochka / Славутянка (Ukrainian, "A Girl from Slavutych")
Gutsulka / Гуцулка (Ukrainian, "Hutsul Woman")
Jooksupolka / Йоксу-полька (Estonian)
Transcarpathian Ballroom / Закарпатский бальный (Ukrainian)
Kazakh Ballroom / Казахский бальный (Kazakh)
Figure Waltz / Фигурный вальс
Vesyalaya Hora / Веселая хора (Moldavian)
"Разрешите пригласить"
"Skaters" / "Конькобежцы"

References

Further reading
Nina Kosheverova "My Life in Dance", Moscow, 2004 (Кошеверова, Нина Николаевна, "Моя жизнь в танце")  
Modern Ballroom Dance (Современный бальный танец), a textbook for students of Institutes of Culture, culture-educational schools and heads of ballroom dance collectives, ed. V.M. Striganov (В.М. Стриганов) and V.I.Uralskaya (В.И.Уральская), Moscow, Prosveshcheniye (1977)   — the only book in ballroom dancing in the pre-perestroika Soviet Union.

Ballroom dance
Soviet culture